The Razmak Brigade was an Infantry formation of the Indian Army during World War II. It was in existence in September 1939, for service on the North West Frontier. It was normal practice for newly formed battalions to be posted to the North West Frontier for service before being sent to Africa, Burma or Italy.

Formation
These units served with the brigade during the war
1st Leicestershire Regiment
1/8th Gurkha Rifles
2/1st Gurkha Rifles
2/7th Rajput Regiment
25th Mountain Regiment Indian Artillery
3/10th Baluch Regiment
5/11th Sikh Regiment
1/19th Hyderabad Regiment
1st Royal Warwickshire Regiment
2nd Suffolk Regiment
2/2nd Gurkha Rifles
1st Patiala Infantry
1/10th Gurkha Rifles
1st Queen's Royal Regiment
6/5th Mahratta Light Infantry
5/8th Punjab Regiment
7/11th Sikh Regiment
1st Royal Warwickshire Regiment
5/8th Punjab Regiment
2nd King's Own Scottish Borderers
4/17th Dogra Regiment
20th Mountain Regiment IA
4/9th Gurkha Rifles
4/3rd Gurkha Rifles
1/16th Punjab Regiment
15/13th Frontier Force Rifles
2nd Green Howards
6/8th Punjab Regiment
26th Mountain Regiment IA
7/1st Punjab Regiment
15/10th Baluch Regiment
3/4th Gurkha Rifles
8/2nd Punjab Regiment
9/19th Hyderabad Regiment
14/14th Punjab Regiment
4/2nd Gurkha Rifles
7th York and Lancaster Regiment
6/18th Royal Garhwal Rifles
7th Jammu and Kashmir Infantry
5/1st Gurkha Rifles	
1st Wiltshire Regiment
10th Field Company Indian Engineers
7th Light Tank Company RA
Faridkot Field Company Indian States Forces
482nd Field Company IE
366th Field Company IE

See also

 List of Indian Army Brigades in World War II

References

British Indian Army brigades